Sergey Sergeyevich Averintsev (Russian: Сергей Сергеевич Аверинцев, December 10, 1937, in Moscow – February 21, 2004, in Vienna) was a Russian literary scholar, Byzantinist and Slavist.

Biography
Averintsev was the son of the biologist Sergey Vasilyevich Averintsev. He studied classical philology in Moscow and received in 1967 with a thesis on Plutarch the title of Candidate of the Sciences. In 1979, he became a Doctor of Sciences with a thesis on Byzantine poetry.

He first worked as an editor, then from 1966 to 1971 at the Institute of Art Science of the Academy of Sciences. From 1971 to 1991, he was a member of the Gorki Institute for World Literature. In 1989, he became a professor at the Institute of the World Culture of the Moscow Lomonosov University. In 1994, he was appointed to the University of Vienna, where he was a full professor of East Slavonic literature until his death. Averintsev was from 1987 corresponding, from 2003 full member of the Russian Academy of Sciences. He was awarded the Lenin Komsomol Prize in 1968, the State Prize of the Soviet Union in 1990, and the State Prize of the Russian Federation in 1996. In 1994, he became a member of the Pontifical Academy of Social Sciences. In 1995, he was awarded the Dr. Leopold Lucas Prize for his essay "Die Solidarität in dem verfemten Gott. Die Erfahrung der Sowjetjahre als Mahnung für die Gegenwart und Zukunft".

In addition to his works in the field of ancient philology, Averintsev became known above all through studies of the Russian poetry of the Silver Age.

Publications in Western European languages

Books

 L'anima e lo specchio. L'universo della poetica bizantina. Bologna, 1988 
 Atene e Gerusalemme. Contrapposizione e incontro di due principi creativi. Roma, 1994 
 (with M.I. Rupnik) Adamo e il suo costato. Spiritualità dell'amore coniugale. Roma, 1996 
 Die Solidarität in dem verfemten Gott. Die Erfahrung der Sowjetjahre als Mahnung für die Gegenwart und Zukunft. Tübingen, 1996 
 Sophia, la sapienza di Dio. Breve guida alla mostra. Milano, 1999

Collected studies

 Cose attuali, cose eterne: la Russia d'oggi e la cultura europea. Milano, 1989
 Dieci poeti. Ritratti e destini. Virgilio, Efrem Siro, Gregorio da Narek, Deržavin, Žukovskij, Vjačeslav Ivanov, Mandel’štam, Brentano, Chesterton, Hesse. Milano, 2001 
 Die fremde Sprache sei mir eine Hülle... Essays und Vorträge. Wien, 2005 
 La sagesse et ses formes: Conception de la Sophia et sens de l'icône. Paris, 2011 
 Verbo di Dio e parola dell'uomo: Discorsi romani = Римские речи. Слово Божие и слово человеческое. Roma, Москва, 2013

Articles in periodicals

Contributions to books

 
 'Verbo di Dio e parola dell'uomo = Слово Божие и слово человеческое', in S. Averintsev, Verbo di Dio e parola dell'uomo: Discorsi romani = Римские речи. Слово Божие и слово человеческое. (Roma, Москва, 2013), 78-117
 'Della Sapienza dobbiamo parlare con sapienza = О Премудрости мы должны говорить с мудростью', in S. Averintsev, Verbo di Dio e parola dell'uomo: Discorsi romani = Римские речи. Слово Божие и слово человеческое. (Roma, Москва, 2013), 118-125
 'La Sofia nell'Antico Testamento = Премудрость в Ветхом Завете', in S. Averintsev, Verbo di Dio e parola dell'uomo: Discorsi romani = Римские речи. Слово Божие и слово человеческое. (Roma, Москва, 2013), 126-159
 'Sofiologia e mariologia: pre-considerazioni metodologiche = Софиология и мариология: методологические размышления', in S. Averintsev, Verbo di Dio e parola dell'uomo: Discorsi romani = Римские речи. Слово Божие и слово человеческое. (Roma, Москва, 2013), 160-189
 'Sofiologia e mariologia: note introduttive = Софиология и мариология: предварительные замечания', in S. Averintsev, Verbo di Dio e parola dell'uomo: Discorsi romani = Римские речи. Слово Божие и слово человеческое. (Roma, Москва, 2013), 190-201
 'La Sapienza di Dio ha costruito una casa (Pr 9,1) per la dimora di Dio stesso tra noi: il concetto di Sofia e il significato dell’icona = Премудрость Божия построила дом (Притчи 9:1), чтобы Бог пребывал с нами: концепция Софии и смысл иконы', in S. Averintsev, Verbo di Dio e parola dell'uomo: Discorsi romani = Римские речи. Слово Божие и слово человеческое. (Roma, Москва, 2013), 202-229
 'Per comprendere l'iscrizione sulla conca dell'abside centrale della chiesa della Sofia in Kiev = К уяснению смысла надписи над конхой центральной апсиды Софии Киевской', in S. Averintsev, Verbo di Dio e parola dell'uomo: Discorsi romani = Римские речи. Слово Божие и слово человеческое. (Roma, Москва, 2013), 230-341
 'Sofia = София', in S. Averintsev, Verbo di Dio e parola dell'uomo: Discorsi romani = Римские речи. Слово Божие и слово человеческое. (Roma, Москва, 2013), 342-353
 'Sofia, l'idea russa = София как русская идея', in S. Averintsev, Verbo di Dio e parola dell'uomo: Discorsi romani = Римские речи. Слово Божие и слово человеческое. (Roma, Москва, 2013), 354-359
 'Discorso per l'inauguratione della mostra "Sophia, la sapienza di Dio" = Речь на открытии выставки "София, Премудрость Божия"', in S. Averintsev, Verbo di Dio e parola dell'uomo: Discorsi romani = Римские речи. Слово Божие и слово человеческое. (Roma, Москва, 2013), 360-387
 'Breve guida alla mostra = Краткий путеводитель по выставке', in S. Averintsev, Verbo di Dio e parola dell'uomo: Discorsi romani = Римские речи. Слово Божие и слово человеческое. (Roma, Москва, 2013), 388-439
 'La sapienza nella prospettiva delle scienze = Премудрость в перспективе наук', in S. Averintsev, Verbo di Dio e parola dell'uomo: Discorsi romani = Римские речи. Слово Божие и слово человеческое. (Roma, Москва, 2013), 440-445
 'L'immagine biblica della sapienza come alternativa alla "cultura della morte" = Библейский образ Премудрости как альтернатива "культуре смерти"', in S. Averintsev, Verbo di Dio e parola dell'uomo: Discorsi romani = Римские речи. Слово Божие и слово человеческое. (Roma, Москва, 2013), 446-467
 'Improvisso = Импровизация', in S. Averintsev, Verbo di Dio e parola dell'uomo: Discorsi romani = Римские речи. Слово Божие и слово человеческое. (Roma, Москва, 2013), 468-471
 '"Ad fontes!" (Atene, Gerusalemme, Roma). Tesi = "Ad fontes!" (Афины, Иерусалим, Рим). Тезисы', in S. Averintsev, Verbo di Dio e parola dell'uomo: Discorsi romani = Римские речи. Слово Божие и слово человеческое. (Roma, Москва, 2013), 472-479
 '"Ad fontes!" (Athens, Jerusalem, Rome) Theses', in S. Averintsev, Verbo di Dio e parola dell'uomo: Discorsi romani = Римские речи. Слово Божие и слово человеческое. (Roma, Москва, 2013), 480-483
 'La solidarietà nel Dio proscritto: l'esperienza degli anni sovietici come monito per il presente e per il futuro = Солидарность во имя опального Бога: опыт советского времени как предостережение для настоящего времени и на будущее', in S. Averintsev, Verbo di Dio e parola dell'uomo: Discorsi romani = Римские речи. Слово Божие и слово человеческое. (Roma, Москва, 2013), 484-519
 'Vjačeslav Ivanov e la "Schuldfrage" = Вячеслав Иванов и "Schuldfrage"', in S. Averintsev, Verbo di Dio e parola dell'uomo: Discorsi romani = Римские речи. Слово Божие и слово человеческое. (Roma, Москва, 2013), 520-531
 'Il battesimo della Rus' e il cammino della cultura russa = Крещение Руси и путь русской культуры', in S. Averintsev, Verbo di Dio e parola dell'uomo: Discorsi romani = Римские речи. Слово Божие и слово человеческое. (Roma, Москва, 2013), 532-561
 'La Russia e la cristianità europea = Россия и европейское христианство', in S. Averintsev, Verbo di Dio e parola dell'uomo: Discorsi romani = Римские речи. Слово Божие и слово человеческое. (Roma, Москва, 2013), 562-599
 'La spiritualità dell'Europa orientale e il suo contributo alla formazione della nuova identità europea = Духовность Восточной Европы и ее вклад в формирование новой европейской идентичности', in S. Averintsev, Verbo di Dio e parola dell'uomo: Discorsi romani = Римские речи. Слово Божие и слово человеческое. (Roma, Москва, 2013), 600-637
 'Il ruschio della teocrazia = Риск теократии', in S. Averintsev, Verbo di Dio e parola dell'uomo: Discorsi romani = Римские речи. Слово Божие и слово человеческое. (Roma, Москва, 2013), 638-645
 '"Ut unum sint": uniti dinanzi al sembiante ostile del principe di questo mondo = "Ut unum sint": единство перед лицом вражды князя мира сего', in S. Averintsev, Verbo di Dio e parola dell'uomo: Discorsi romani = Римские речи. Слово Божие и слово человеческое. (Roma, Москва, 2013), 646-669
 'Sagesse divine - l'inscription de Sainte-Sophie de Kiev', in S. Averintsev, La sagesse et ses formes: Conception de la Sophia et sens de l'icône. (Paris, 2011), 13-64
 'Pour que Dieu soit avec nous', in S. Averintsev, La sagesse et ses formes: Conception de la Sophia et sens de l'icône. (Paris, 2011)
 'Sophiologie et mariologie', in S. Averintsev, La sagesse et ses formes: Conception de la Sophia et sens de l'icône. (Paris, 2011)
 'La Beauté première', in S. Averintsev, La sagesse et ses formes: Conception de la Sophia et sens de l'icône. (Paris, 2011), 93-101
 'Constantinople/Byzantium. VI. Literature', in Religion Past & Present: Encyclopedia of Theology and Religion, Vol. 3 (Leiden, 2007), 445-447
 'Some constant characteristics of Byzantine Orthodoxy', in Byzantine Orthodoxies. Papers from the Thirty-Sixth Spring Symposium of Byzantine Studies, University of Durham, 23-25 March 2002, ed. A. Louth, A. Casiday (Aldershot, 2006), 215-228
 'Historismus à la russe – Alexej Konstantinovič Tolstoj', in 19./20. Jahrhundert : von den Reformen Alexanders II. bis zum Ersten Weltkrieg, ed. D. Herrmann (München, 2006), 366-386
 'Alexei Konstantinowitsch Tolstoi (1817–1875): Historismus à la Russe', in S. Awerinzew, Die fremde Sprache sei mir eine Hülle... Essays und Vorträge (Wien, 2005), 11-30
 'Das Neue Testament und die hellenistischen Literaturgattungen', in S. Awerinzew, Die fremde Sprache sei mir eine Hülle... Essays und Vorträge (Wien, 2005), 31-44
 'Die Idee des “Imperium Sacrum” in Byzanz und Russland: Kontinuität und Evolution', in S. Awerinzew, Die fremde Sprache sei mir eine Hülle... Essays und Vorträge (Wien, 2005), 45-62
 'Die slawische Apokalyptik', in S. Awerinzew, Die fremde Sprache sei mir eine Hülle... Essays und Vorträge (Wien, 2005), 63-68
 'Die Solidarität in dem verfemten Gott. Die Erfahrung der Sowjetjahre als Mahnung für Gegenwart und Zukunft', in S. Awerinzew, Die fremde Sprache sei mir eine Hülle... Essays und Vorträge (Wien, 2005), 69-80
 'Gegenwärtige Geistesströmungen in Russland', in S. Awerinzew, Die fremde Sprache sei mir eine Hülle... Essays und Vorträge (Wien, 2005), 81-96
 'Goethe und Puschkin (1749–1799–1999)', in S. Awerinzew, Die fremde Sprache sei mir eine Hülle... Essays und Vorträge (Wien, 2005), 97-112
 'Humorlosigkeit des Zeitgeistes', in S. Awerinzew, Die fremde Sprache sei mir eine Hülle... Essays und Vorträge (Wien, 2005), 113-118
 'Das Heilige als Aufgabe für Reflexion und Erlebnis im Kontext der Polarität von  “Omnipräsenz” und “Realpräsenz”', in S. Awerinzew, Die fremde Sprache sei mir eine Hülle... Essays und Vorträge (Wien, 2005), 119-128
 'Jesus in der Orthodoxen Christenheit', in S. Awerinzew, Die fremde Sprache sei mir eine Hülle... Essays und Vorträge (Wien, 2005), 129-144
 '“Die fremde Sprache sei mir  eine Hülle...“ Ossip Mandelschtam denkt an Ewald Kleist', in S. Awerinzew, Die fremde Sprache sei mir eine Hülle... Essays und Vorträge (Wien, 2005), 145-164
 'Russische Kultur und europäische Christenheit', in S. Awerinzew, Die fremde Sprache sei mir eine Hülle... Essays und Vorträge (Wien, 2005), 165-180
 'Vom Wesen der Ikone. Zwei Betrachtungen', in S. Awerinzew, Die fremde Sprache sei mir eine Hülle... Essays und Vorträge (Wien, 2005), 181-186
 'Zum Problem der Globalisierung', in S. Awerinzew, Die fremde Sprache sei mir eine Hülle... Essays und Vorträge (Wien, 2005), 187-196
 'Kafka und die biblische Alternative zum allgemeinen europaischen Typus der narrativen Kultur', in S. Awerinzew, Die fremde Sprache sei mir eine Hülle... Essays und Vorträge (Wien, 2005), 197-206
 'Fass des Unfassbaren – Poetik und Dialektik des Ὕμνος Ἀκάθιστος"', in Christus bei den Vätern. Forscher aus dem Osten und Westen Europas an den Quellen des gemeinsamen Glaubens, ed. Y. de Andia, P.L. Hofrichter (Innsbruck, Wien, 2004), 99-109
 'Jesus in der Orthodoxen Christenheit', in Jesus: Mensch und Geheimnis in Glauben und Kunst, ed. I.F. Görres, W. Ziehr, D. Flusser (Freiburg, 2004)
 'Sulla classicita dell'opera di Puškin', in Atti del Convegno Internationale, Milano 1999, 3-4 giugno (Milano, 2004), 39-46
 'La spiritualità dell'Europa orientale e il suo contributo alla formazione della nuova identità europea', in La filosofia dell'Europa: febbraio 2003-giugno 2003, Roma, Sala Zuccari, ed. E. Berti (Roma, 2004)
 'Goethe und Puschkin (1749–1799–1999)', in Alexander S. Puschkin und das europäische Geistes- und Kulturleben, ed. E. Vyslonzil (Frankfurt am Main, 2003), 19-32
 'From Biography to Hagiography: Some Stable Patterns in the Greek and Latin Tradition of Lives', in Mapping Lives: The Uses of Biography, ed. P. France, W. St Clair (Oxford, 2002), 19–36
 'Jerusalem, mother to us all: The Holy Land is the true navel of the world = Gerusalemme, nostra madre commune: La Terra Santa é il vero ombelico del mondo', in A Window over the Mediterranean sea = Finestra sul Mediterraneo, ed. S. Buonadonna (Genova, 2001)
 'Bakhtin, Laughter, and Christian Culture', in Bakhtin and Religion: A Feeling for Faith, ed. S.M. Felch, P.J. Contino (Evanston, 2001), 79–98
 'La storica di Puškin al tramonto del razionalismo retorico', in Puškin europeo, ed. S. Graciotti (Venezia, 2001), 21-30
 'Duemila anni con Virgilio', in S. Averincev, Dieci poeti. Ritratti e destini (Milano, 2001), 19-42
 'Tra "esplicazione" e "nascondimento": la situazione dell’immagine nella poesia di Efrem Siro', in S. Averincev, Dieci poeti. Ritratti e destini (Milano, 2001)
  'La poesia di Deržavin', in S. Averincev, Dieci poeti. Ritratti e destini (Milano, 2001), 103-115
  'Riflessioni sulle traduzioni di Žukovskij', in S. Averincev, Dieci poeti. Ritratti e destini (Milano, 2001), 117-138
  'La poesia di Clemens Brentano', in S. Averincev, Dieci poeti. Ritratti e destini (Milano, 2001)
  'G.K. Chesterton, l'imprevisibilita del buon senso', in S. Averincev, Dieci poeti. Ritratti e destini (Milano, 2001)
  'Hermann Hesse', in S. Averincev, Dieci poeti. Ritratti e destini (Milano, 2001)
 'Vjačeslav Ivanov, il maestro dell'anamnesi universale in Christo', in La poetica della fede nel'900: letteratura e cattolicesimo nel secolo della "morte di Dio" (Firenze, 2000), 81-94
 'Belleza e santita', in Forme della santita russa: atti dell’VIII Convegno ecumenico internazionale di spiritualità ortodossa (sezione russa), Bose, 21-23 settembre 2000, ed. A. Mainardi (Bose, 2000), 315–332
 'Ricerca di Dio e ritorno alla Chiesa: l'intelligencija sovietica e il problema religioso', in La notte della chiesa russa: atti dell'VII Convegno ecumenico internazionale di spiritualità russa: "La chiesa ortodossa russa dal 1943 ai nostri giorni", Bose, 15-18 settembre 1999, ed. A. Mainardi (Bose, 2000), 175-190
 'God's Wisdom Building a "House" (Prov. 9,1) for God's Own Dwelling with Us: the Concept of Sophia and the Meaning of Icon', in Jews and Eastern Slavs: Essays on Intercultural Relations, ed. W. Moskovich, L. Finberg, M. Feller (Jerusalem, 2000), 11-18
 'Della Sapienza dobbiamo parlare con sapienza', in Sophia. La Sapienza di Dio, ed. G.C. Azzaro, P. Azzaro (Roma, Milano, 1999), ix
 'La Sapienza di Dio ha costruito una casa (Pr 9,1) per la dimora di Dio stesso tra noi: il concetto di Sofia e il significato dell’icona', in Sophia. La Sapienza di Dio, ed. G.C. Azzaro, P. Azzaro (Roma, Milano, 1999), 3-7
 'Sofiologia e Mariologia: osservazioni preliminari', in Sophia. La Sapienza di Dio, ed. G.C. Azzaro, P. Azzaro (Roma, Milano, 1999), 9-13
 'L’Icona e il problema della rappresentazione religiosa', in Il mondo e il sovra-mondo dell’icona, ed. S. Gracciotti (Venezia, 1998), 1-6
 'Temi cristiani della cultura russa e l’Occidente: alcune osservazioni', in La sfida della comunione nella diversità. Atti del Convegno internazionale di studio della fondazione Russia Cristiana. (Milano, 1998), 59-67
 'Reconstruire le langage, reconstruire la pensée?', in La Vendée: après la Terreur, la reconstruction. Acte du Colloque tenu à La Roche-sur-Yon les 25, 26 et 27 avril 1996, ed. A. Gérard (Paris, 1997), 561-566
 'Einige Bemerkungen zur Eigenart der Aneignung der christlichen Kultur im vorpetrinischen Russland', in Sophia – Die Weisheit Gottes. Gesammelte Aufsatze 1983-1995, ed. S.F.v. Lilienfeld (Erlangen, 1997), 546-553
 'Kafka und die biblische Alternative zum allgemeinen europaischen Typus der narrativen Kultur', in Das Phänomen Franz Kafka. Vorträge des Symposions der Österreichischen Franz Kafka-Gesellschaft in Klosterneuburg im Jahr 1995, ed. W. Kraus, N. Winkler (Praha, 1997), 1-14
 'Das Neue Testament und die hellenistischen Literaturgattungen', in Hellenismus. Beitrage zur Erforschung von Akkulturation und politischer Ordnung in den Staaten des hellenistischen Zeitalters. Akten des Internationalen Hellenismus-Kolloquiums, 9.–14. Marz 1994 in Berlin, ed. B. Funck (Tübingen, 1996), 307-318
 'Verbe de Dieu et parole humaine', in Face à la Création. La responsabilité de l'homme. Rencontre entre l'Est et l'Ouest. Novgorod-Saint Petersbourg, 28 août-2 septembre 1995, ed. M.-J. Guillaume (Mame, 1996), 75-86
 'Ut unum sint: L’Unité face au Prince de ce monde', in L’Unité, ed. P. de Laubier. (Fribourg, 1996), 13-28.
 'Il cattolicesimo italiano attraverso gli occhi dei russi', in I russi e l'Italia, ed. V. Strada (Milano, 1995), 51-56
 'Byzantium and Medieval Russia: Two Types of Spirituality', in Roots of Russia: Paving the Way, ed. N.Maslova, T.Pleshakova. (New York, 1995), 7-24
 '”Imago Mundi”. Du mythe à la science', in Après Galilée. Science et foi: nouveau dialogue. (Paris, 1994), 111–122
 'Die slawische Apokalyptik', in Europa, Europa. Das Jahrhundert der Avantgarde in Mittel- und Osteuropa. Kunst- und Ausstellungshalle der Bundesrepublik Deutschland, Bonn, 27. Mai – 16. Oktober 1994, ed. R. Stanislawski, C. Brockhaus. (Bonn, 1994), 32-34
 'Bakhtin and the Russian attitude to laughter', in Bakhtin: Carnival and other subjects, ed. D.G. Shepherd (Amsterdam, 1993), 13-19
 'The Baptism of Rus' and the path of Russian culture', in The Christianization of ancient Russia, a millennium: 988-1988, ed. Y. Hamant (Paris, 1992), 139-147
 'El Aristotelismo Cristiano como forma de la Tradición Occidental', in Cristianismo y cultura en Europa. (Madrid, 1992), 54-58
 'La vocazione della filosofia e unità della Chiesa', in Cristianesimo e cultura in Europa. Memoria, coscienza, progetto. Atti del Simposio presinodale. (Stato della Città del Vaticano, 1992)
 'Visions of the Invisible: the dual nature of the icon', in Gates of Mystery: The Art of Holy Russia, ed. R. Grierson (Fort Worth, TX, 1992), 11–14
 'Vom Wesen der Ikone. Zwei Betrachtungen = О сущности иконы. Два соображения', in Sowjetische Kunst um 1990 = Советское Искусство около 1990 года, ed. J. Harten. (Köln, 1991)
 'Il mistero dell'oro nell'icona', in Icona: volto del mistero, ed. A. Vicini (Milano, 1991), 41–46
 'The Idea of Holy Russia', in Russia and Europe, ed. P. Dukes. (London, 1991), 10-23
 'Témoins de la production intellectuelle de l’Antiquité et du Moyen Age: quelques considérations', in La naissance du texte. Archives européennes et production intellectuelle, Colloque international 21-23 Septembre 1987. (Paris, 1987), 213-215
 'Die Symbolik des frühen Mittelalters. Zu einem Problemkreis', in Studien zur Geschichte der westlichen Philosophie. (Frankfurt a. M., 1986), 72-104
 'Dauer im Wechsel: Krise und Identität der abendländischen Vergil-Tradition', in Zum Problem der Geschichtlichkeit ästhetischer Normen. Die Antike im Wandel des Urteils des 19. Jahrhunderts. (Berlin, 1986), 39-45
 'The Poetry of Vyacheslav Ivanov', in Vyacheslav Ivanov: Poet, Critic and Philosopher, ed. R.L. Jackson, L. Nelson, Jr. (New Haven, 1986), 25-48
 'Aux sources de la terminologie philosophique européenne', in La Philosophie grecque et sa portée culturelle et historique, ed. S. Mouraviev, A. Garcia (Москва, 1985), 11-38
 'Alcune considerazioni sulla tradizione virgiliana nella letteratura europea', in Atti del convegno mondiale di studi su Virgilio” a cura dell’Accademia Nazionale Virgiliana, Mantova-Roma-Napoli, 19-24 settembre 1981, vol. 1. (Milano, 1984), 110–122
 'Eine römische Sophia-Inschrift aus dem 12. Jahrhundert', in Unser ganzes Leben Christus unserm Gott überantworten. Studien zur ostkirchlichen Spiritualität. Fairy v. Lilienfeld zum 65. Geburtstag, ed. P. Hauptmann (Göttingen, 1982), 240-244
 'Zu den Ethopoiien des Nikephoros Basilakes', in Eikon und Logos: Beiträge zur Erforschung byzantinischer Kulturtraditionen. Konrad Onasch zur Vollendung des 65. Lebensjahres, vol. 1, ed. H. Goltz (Halle, 1981), 9-14
 'Das dauerhafte Erbe der Griechen: Die rhetorische Grundeinstellung als Synthese des Traditionalismus und der Reflexion', in Proceeding of the IXth Congress of the International Comparative Literature Association, Innsbruck, 1979. (Innsbruck, 1981), 267-270
 'Tolstoï et le monde antique', in Tolstoï aujourd'hui: Colloque international Tolstoï tenu à Paris du 10 au 13 octobre 1978, à l'occasion du cent-cinquantième anniversaire de la naissance de Léon Tolstoï. (Paris, 1980), 71-76
 'Interpretation of the Past', in Aesthetics and the Development of Literature, ed. L. Gerasimova, N. Maslova. 2ed. (Москва, 1980), 160–173
 'Le caractère général de la symbolique au Haut Moyen Age', in Travaux sur les systèmes de signes: école de Tartu. (Bruxelles, 1976), 152-155

Bibliography

 Pyman-Sokolov, A. ‘In memoriam. Sergei Sergeevich Averintsev, 10 December 1937 – 21 February 2004, in Slavonica, Vol.10, No.2, 2004, 195-201
 Sedakova, O. 'Reflections on Averintsev's Method', in Studies in East European Thought, Vol. 58, No. 2, 2006, 73-84
 Sigov, K. 'Averintsev's Archipelago: Towards Understanding the Era of Post-Atheism, in  Studies in East European Thought, Vol. 58, No. 2, 2006, 85-93
Wort – Geist – Kultur: Gedenkschrift für Sergej S. Averincev, ed. J. Besters-Dilger et al. Frankfurt am Main, 2007 
 Janocha, M. 'Serge Averintsev. Byzantinologie dans la perspective humaniste', in Towards Rewriting? New Approaches to Byzantine Art and Archaeology, ed. P.Ł. Grotowski. Warsaw, 2010, 283-292
 Marchadier, B. ' Serge Averintsev - la philologie comme retour au Logos', in S. Averintsev, La sagesse et ses formes: Conception de la Sophia et sens de l'icône. (Paris, 2011), 5-12
 Louth, A. Modern Orthodox Thinkers: From the Philokalia to the Present . London, 2015, 319-321
 Epstein, M. The Phoenix of Philosophy: Russian Thought of the Late Soviet Period (1953–1991). New York, 2019, 211-221

See also
Byzantine studies

External links
Publications (Katalog der Deutschen Nationalbibliothek)

References

1937 births
2004 deaths
20th-century Russian poets
Russian philologists
20th-century philologists